Hamizul Izaidi bin Zulkifli (born 24 February 1993) is a Malaysian footballer who plays as a forward for Perak.

References

External links
 

1993 births
Living people
People from Perak
Association football forwards
Malaysian footballers
Perak F.C. players
PKNP FC players
Kuantan FA players
Malaysia Super League players
Malaysia Premier League players